Edward Robert Henry Herbert, 5th Earl of Powis TD CBE CStJ (19 May 1889 – 15 January 1974)

Early life
Herbert was born on 19 May 1889. He was the son of Col. Edward William Herbert and Beatrice Anne Williamson. Among his siblings, who were later granted the rank of earl's children, Lady Dorothy Marguerite Elizabeth Herbert (wife of Hon. Robert Hepburn-Stuart-Forbes-Trefusis, son of Charles Hepburn-Stuart-Forbes-Trefusis, 20th Baron Clinton), Lady Phyllis Hedworth Camilla Herbert (wife of Martin Drummond Vesey Holt of Holt's Military Banking family), and Christian Victor Charles Herbert (later the 6th Earl of Powis).

His paternal grandparents were Hon. Robert Charles Herbert (a younger son of Edward Herbert, 2nd Earl of Powis and Lucy Herbert, Countess of Powis) and the former Anna Maria Cludde (only child and heiress of Edward Cludde). His maternal grandparents were Sir Hedworth Williamson, 8th Baronet and Lady Elizabeth Liddell (a daughter of Henry Liddell, 1st Earl of Ravensworth).

He was educated at Eton College before attending Christ Church, Oxford.

Career

Herbert fought in World War I, where he was wounded. He gained the rank of Major in the King's Royal Rifle Corps, was attached to the Tank Corps Training Centre, and fought in the Iraqi revolt of 1920. He was awarded the Territorial Decoration and was appointed Commander of the Most Venerable Order of the Hospital of St. John of Jerusalem.

Herbert gained the rank of Lieutenant-Colonel in 1939 in the King's Shropshire Light Infantry and fought in World War II. He was appointed Commander of the Order of British Empire in 1945.

Upon the death of George Herbert, 4th Earl of Powis, his first cousin once removed, he succeeded as the 5th Earl of Powis on 9 November 1952. To afford the estate duties of £601,321 (which was then $1,683,698) arising from the death of the 4th Earl, Lord Powis offered the tax collector 199 family heirlooms and sold more than 15,000 acres and gave Powis Castle to the government in order to preserve it (and reduce the tax bill by about £320,000. The family heirlooms included 83 paintings, some by Sir Joshua Reynolds and Thomas Gainsborough, 25 statues, and 13 tapestries.

Personal life
On 12 March 1932, Herbert was married to Ella Mary Rathborne (1890-1987), a daughter of Col. William Hans Rathborne of Scripplestown, County Dublin, and Bella Grace MacNeale. After he inherited the earldom, he commissioned Richard von Marientreu to do a portrait of himself and his wife, both completed in 1954.

Lord Powis died on 15 January 1974.

References

External links
Edward Robert Henry Herbert, 5th earl of Powis at the Getty Museum
Edward Robert Henry Herbert, 5th Earl of Powis at The National Portrait Gallery (United Kingdom)

1889 births
1974 deaths
People educated at Eton College
Alumni of Christ Church, Oxford
Earls of Powis
Edward